UNISOC, formerly Spreadtrum Communications, Inc., is a Chinese fabless semiconductor company headquartered in Shanghai which produces chipsets for mobile phones. UNISOC develops its business in two major fields - consumer electronics and industrial electronics, including smart phones, feature phones, smart audio systems, smart wear and other application fields; Industrial electronics cover the fields such as LAN IoT, WAN IoT and smart display.

As of 2021, it is the fourth largest mobile processor manufacturer in the world, after Mediatek, Qualcomm and Apple, with 9% of global market share.

Research and development 
UNISOC has research centres in Shanghai, Beijing, Tianjin, Suzhou, Hangzhou, Chengdu, Xiamen, United States, Finland and India, technical support centre in Shenzhen, and international field support offices in South Korea, Taiwan and Mexico. Its products support a broad range of wireless communications standards, including GSM, GPRS, EDGE, TD-SCDMA, W-CDMA, HSPA+ and TD-LTE. UNISOC has a global R & D layout, with more than 5,000 employees worldwide, 90% of whom are R&D personnel.

The company originally produced chips for GSM handsets, but most of its resources in the late 2000s were then focused on the Chinese TD-SCDMA 3G standard. In addition to GSM and combined GSM/TD-SCDMA baseband chipsets, Spreadtrum also supplies chips for two Chinese mobile TV standards: TD-MBMS and CMMB. Spreadtrum's customers accounted for 50% of TD-SCDMA handset sales in China Mobile's current round of TD-SCDMA trials.

UNISOC, then still known as Spreadtrum, was formerly a public company listed on NASDAQ, but agreed to an acquisition by Tsinghua Holdings subsidiary Tsinghua Unigroup, in July 2013, for about US$1.78 billion; the deal completed on 23 December 2013.

In 2014, Tsinghua Unigroup acquired RDA Microelectronics for US$907 Million. RDA Microelectronics was a fabless semiconductor company that designs, develops and markets wireless system-on-chip and radio-frequency semiconductors for cellular, connectivity and broadcast applications.

In 2018, the company Spreadtrum Communications and RDA Microelectronics was merged and rebranded to UNISOC, in which Intel agreed to invest $1.5 billion for a 20 percent stake. The company also began working on a 5G smartphone platform with an Intel 5G modem. In February 2018, Spreadtrum was introducing high-end smartphones with augmented reality.

Unisoc released 5G technology platform Makalu 1.0 and 5G baseband chip V510 in February 2019, then, a year later, launched T7520, a 5G SoC initiating the use of 6nm EUV advanced process technology.

In 2021, it beat HiSilicon and ranked third in Chinese smartphone AP market share.

Main products 

Currently, UNISOC’s main products include mobile communication central processing units, baseband chips, AI chips, radio frequency front-end chips, radio frequency chips and other communication, computing and control chips, which are widely used in consumer electronics fields such as smart phones, smart tablets, and smart wearables, finance, smart logistics, smart power, smart medical and other industries.

See also 
Semiconductor industry
Semiconductor industry in China

 AllWinner A1X 
 Intel Atom
 HiSilicon
 Freescale i.MX
 Leadcore Technology
 MediaTek
 MStar Semiconductors
 Nufront
 Rockchip RK
 Qualcomm Snapdragon 
 Nvidia Tegra
 Broadcom VideoCore

References 

Fabless semiconductor companies
Semiconductor companies of China
Companies based in Shanghai
Companies formerly listed on the Nasdaq
Chinese brands
Microprocessors made in China